Danny Hollis is a Christian country music singer-songwriter who was a finalist for a Grammy Award in 1980 as a member of the Mercy River Boys. He has toured across the United States for over fifty years, performing as a member of several bands, a studio guitarist, and as a solo artist. Danny Hollis is in the Texas Gospel Music Hall of Fame as a former member of the Singing Christians and the Mercy River Boys.

Danny Hollis began his musical journey as the guitarist and lead singer of the Journeymen Quartet in 1974. In 1977, he joined the Singing Christians, recording one album on Canaan Records. He also toured with Wally Fowler, and Jimmie Davis playing electric guitar.

In 1979, Danny Hollis and seven other musicians formed the Mercy River Boys. They recorded an album, ”Breakout” Canaan Records. The album crossed over from Southern Gospel to Country music, recording hits in multiple music genres. The album was a finalist for the prestigious NARAS’ Grammy award in 1980 for ’Best Gospel Performance Traditional.’ The album was also nominated for the Gospel Music Association’s Dove award.

The Mercy River Boys disbanded in 1984. Danny, Emory Atkins and Ronny Ricks started a new Christian country band, Paradise. He recorded two albums on Englwood Records, ’God Bless The U.S.A.’ and ’Invade the Darkness.’

Danny continues to live in East Texas and performs country music. In 2015, Wayne Christian, Emory Atkins, Danny Hollis, and the original eight members of the Mercy River Boys were inducted into the Texas Gospel Music Hall of Fame.

Discography

References

External links
 Photo Danny Hollis playing guitar at the Last Mercy River Boys Concert in Oklahoma City circa 1984
 https://web.500px.com/photo/298887685/danny-hollis-mercy-river-boys-1979-84-paradise-1985-91-by-emerson-lee/
 Photo Grammy Award
 https://web.500px.com/photo/298901757/grammy-award-nomination-finalist-1979-mercy-river-boys-breakout-canaan-records-by-emerson-lee/
 Photo Dove Award
 https://web.500px.com/photo/298901245/dove-award-nomination-finalist-1979-80-mercy-river-boys-breakout-canaan-records-by-emerson-lee/
 Photo Mercy River Boys - Breakout Album 1979 Cover A
 https://web.500px.com/photo/298864099/mercy-river-boys-breakout-canaan-records-1979-by-emerson-lee/
 Photo 1979 Concert Handout
 https://web.500px.com/photo/298866503/mercy-river-boys-publicity-photos-1979-80-u-s-tour-by-emerson-lee/

Christian country music
Country singers
American performers of Christian music
Southern gospel performers
Guitarists from Texas
American male singer-songwriters
Living people
Singer-songwriters from Texas
Music of Texas
Year of birth missing (living people)